Boyarinya Kseniya Ioannovna (Ivanovna) Shestova (1560–1631) was a spouse of Fyodor Romanov and the mother of Mikhail Romanov.

Life
The origins of Xeniya Ivanovna have been disputed by genealogists for centuries. It is currently accepted that her surname was Shestova (Шестова; rather than Shastunova, as was previously believed) and that her grandfather was Timofey Gryaznoy, a rich landowner from Uglich.

During Boris Godunov's repression of the Romanovs, she was forced to take the veil, changing her name to Martha (Russian: Марфа). After several years of exile at Tolvuyskiy pogost, she settled with her son in Kostroma. It was there that the ambassadors arrived to inform Mikhail about his election to the Russian throne in 1613. As the previous tsars had been either killed or disgraced, Martha at first declined to bless her son and let him go to Moscow. 

During the first years of his reign, Martha (or the "great nun" as she came to be known) exerted great influence on her moribund and listless son. She placed her relatives, the Saltykovs, at important posts in the government, leading to widespread corruption. Her husband's return from Poland in 1619 put an end to their (and her own) influence in court. She died on 27 January 1631 and was buried in the Novospassky Monastery.

Notes

External links
 Xenia Ivanovna Romanova in the Brockhaus and Efron Encyclopedic Dictionary (in Russian)

1560 births
1631 deaths
House of Romanov
17th-century Eastern Orthodox nuns
Tsardom of Russia nuns